Tahami (Persian: تهامی) is an Iranian surname that may refer to
Ebrahim Tahami (born 1966), Iranian football midfielder
Fakher Tahami (born 1996), Iranian football forward
Hossein Tahami, Iranian freestyle wrestler

See also
Tahamí people in Colombia

Persian-language surnames